Dekajaz was a 10 piece concert jazz band based in Los Angeles.  The group was critically acclaimed and most notably was founded to promote under-represented female jazz artists in the Southern California region much like the group Maiden Voyage.  The group had many prominent performances in Los Angeles during their existence.  Their album Eclectikos was released in September 2003.

History

The DekaJaz Tentet first came together as an all female jazz group in the winter of 1999 as an idea of co-leaders Scheila Gonzalez (sax), Glenda Smith (trumpet), and Megan Foley (drums, arranger).   Eventually the group did evolve into including certain male artists such as trumpeter Lee Thornburg, saxophonist Lee Secard and others.  The group called upon the writing and arranging talents of Jack Cooper, David Caffey, Rick Lawn, Dan Higgins, Paul McKee, as well as their own Lee Secard, Megan Foley and Josh Nelson. Working with such a diverse group of players and composer/arrangers gave the band its unique style and sound. By the time the group was ready to record a CD in 2002, they had settled on a set of personnel who was consistent and knew the book of original, challenging music.  The most noted performance of the group was at the 2005 International Association for Jazz Education Conference in Long Beach, California.

Reception of the group

"This ensemble has become what it set out to be. It is a first rate group with talented players playing great arrangements. They have their own identifiable sound.....a breath of fresh air in today's music scene."

Jeff Hamilton

"...an exact mixture of five women and five men, none of whom are household names in the world of jazz recordings, offer a program of vital, mature jazz performance that is striking in its originality and virtuosity."

Gary Foster

Members
Alto sax/flute/soprano sax - Scheila Gonzalez 
Tenor sax/flute/clarinet - Sharon Hirata
Baritone Sax - Lee Secard (Jennifer Hall earlier)
Trumpet (lead) - Glenda Smith
Trumpet (jazz) - Lee Thornburg
Trombone - Les Benedict
Guitar - Steve Gregory
Piano - Josh Nelson
Bass - Sherry Luchette
Drums - Megan Foley

Discography
Eclectikos (2003)

See also
Scheila Gonzalez

References

External links 

 for Eclectikos 

Women's musical groups
American jazz ensembles from California
Musical groups established in 1999
Musical groups from Los Angeles
Jazz musicians from California
1999 establishments in California
Women in Los Angeles